Unloved and Weeded Out is a compilation by American metalcore band Converge, on January 28, 2003, through Deathwish Inc.

Unloved and Weeded Out features 14 tracks, some of which were previously released rarities while others were previously unreleased. Among other tracks, the album features five demo tracks that were recorded in guitarist Kurt Ballou's parents' basement before signing to Equal Vision Records and studio versions were released on When Forever Comes Crashing, the three tracks that originally made up the 1995 Unloved and Weeded Out EP and one track from Converge's out-of-print debut album Halo in a Haystack.

Track listing

Personnel
Unloved and Weeded Out personnel adapted from CD liner notes.

Music
 Jacob Bannon – vocals, lyrics
 Kurt Ballou – guitars, bass on tracks 3–6
 Nate Newton – bass
 Ben Koller – drums
 Aaron Dalbec – second guitar on tracks 2, 4–7
 Jeff Feinberg – bass on tracks 2, 7
 Stephen Brodsky – bass on tracks 1, 8–12
 Damon Bellorado – drums on tracks 1–12
 "Biggie" – additional vocals on track 13
 Tre McCarthy – backing vocals on track 1
 Matt Pike – backing vocals on track 1

Production and recording
 Jim Seigel – recorded track 1 at The Outpost in May 1997
 Brian McTernan – recorded track 2 at Salad Days in late 1995, recorded tracks 3–6 in March 1995
 Mike West – recorded track 7 at West Sound in 1994
 Chris Chin – recorded tracks 13 & 14 live at Chain Reaction in December 2001
 Kurt Ballou – recorded tracks 8–12 at his parents' basement in June 1997, mixed tracks 8–12 at GodCity in spring 1998, mixed tracks 1–7 at GodCity in March 2002, mixed tracks 13 & 14 at GodCity in May 2002

References

Converge (band) albums
Albums with cover art by Jacob Bannon
2003 compilation albums
Deathwish Inc. compilation albums
Albums produced by Brian McTernan